The 2004 European Curling Championships were held in Sofia, Bulgaria from December 4 to 11.

Men's

A tournament

Final round robin standings

Draws

Draw 1
December 4th, 14:00

Draw 2
December 5th, 8:00

Draw 3
December 5th, 16:00

Draw 4
December 6th, 9:00

Draw 5
December 6th, 19:00

Draw 6
December 7th, 12:00

Draw 7
December 7th, 20:00

Draw 8
December 8th, 14:00

Draw 9
December 9th, 8:00

Tie breaker
December 9th, 16:00

Playoffs

Semifinals
December 10th, 16:00

Bronze-medal game
December 11th, 14:00

Gold-medal game
December 11th, 14:00

Medals

Women's

A tournament

Final round robin standings

Draws

Draw 1
December 4th, 9:00

Draw 2
December 4th, 19:00

Draw 3
December 5th, 12:00

Draw 4
December 5th, 20:00

Draw 5
December 6th, 14:00

Draw 6
December 7th, 8:00

Draw 7
December 7th, 16:00

Draw 8
December 8th, 9:00

Draw 9
December 8th, 19:00

Tie-breaker
December 9th, 12:00

December 9th, 20:00

Playoffs

Semifinals
December 10th, 12:00

Bronze-medal game
December 11th, 9:00

Gold-medal game
December 11th, 9:00

Medals

References
Men: 
Women: 

E
European Curling Championships
European Curling Championships
International curling competitions hosted by Bulgaria
2004 in European sport